Janki Gaunder née Reddy is a former Fijian international lawn bowler.

Bowls career
Gaunder has represented Fiji at the Commonwealth Games, in the pairs event at the 1986 Commonwealth Games.

She won a fours gold medal with Willow Fong, Robin Forster and Betty Olssen at the 1987 Asia Pacific Bowls Championships and a pairs bronze medal two year earlier.

References

Fijian female bowls players
Living people
Bowls players at the 1986 Commonwealth Games
Year of birth missing (living people)